Mārtiņš Antons (7 January 1888, in Kocēni parish – 1941) was a Latvian lawyer and politician.

He graduated from St. Petersburg University in 1912, Faculty of Law, then worked as a lawyer in Riga.
During the First World War he was a Baltic Refugees Committee member, and the Latvian Riflemen Organizing Committee. He was elected member of the Constitutional Assembly (1920), and Labor Party member of the presidium. Involved with politicians in Stockholm, he was deported to Russia, and was killed in 1941 during World War II.

References
This article was initially translated from Latvian Wikipedia

1888 births
1941 deaths
People from Valmiera Municipality
People from Kreis Wolmar
Workers' Party (Latvia) politicians
Members of the People's Council of Latvia
Deputies of the Constitutional Assembly of Latvia
20th-century Latvian lawyers
Freemasons
People who died in the Gulag
Executed politicians
Latvian people executed by the Soviet Union
Lawyers from Riga